Physcus or Physkos may refer to:
 Marmaris, a port in Turkey
 Physca, a town of ancient Macedon, Greece
 Tornadotus, a river in Iraq
Physcus (mythology)